Guillaume Maillard (born 11 October 1998) is a Swiss professional ice hockey centre who is currently playing with EHC Biel on loan from Lausanne HC of the National League (NL). He previously played with Genève-Servette HC.

Playing career

Junior
Maillard started playing hockey with Yverdon junior teams and then moved to Lausanne to join their U15 team in 2011. He went on to play 3 full seasons with the U15 and U17 teams before following his brother in joining HC Fribourg-Gottéron U17 and U20 teams for the 2014-15 season. With little hope of joining Fribourg's professional team in the future, Maillard joined Genève-Servette HC U20 team for the 2015-16 season. He played 24 games for the team this year, putting up 17 points and added 5 points in 3 playoffs contests.

Genève-Servette HC

2016-17
Maillard made his professional debut with Genève-Servette HC in the 2016–17 season, appearing in 8 National League games this season. He spent the majority of the season with Geneva's junior team in the Elite Junior A, where he played 37 games and put up 51 points (21 goals).

2017-18
Maillard eventually played one more year with Geneva's junior team in the 2017–18 season and helped the team win the Elite Junior A championship, tallying 8 points (6 goals) in 9 playoffs games. He scored his first NL goal with Genève-Servette that same year. Maillard also had a brief stint in the Swiss League, appearing in 5 games (1 goal) with HC Ajoie.

2018-19
On May 31, 2018, Maillard signed a two-year contract with Genève-Servette, ending his junior career. Prior to the start of the season, he switched his jersey number from 98 to 11.

Maillard was invited to the New York Islanders prospect camp in the summer of 2018.

Maillard missed the start of the 2018–19 season with a lower body injury before being assigned on a rehab stint with HC Sierre of the MySports League. After having played 12 games with Sierre, putting up 10 points (3 goals), Maillard returned to Geneva and made his NL season debut on November 20 at home, against HC Fribourg-Gottéron.

2019-20
On September 30, 2019, Maillard agreed to an early two-year contract extension with Geneva through the 2021/22 season. Maillard struggled to produce offensively during the 2019–20 season and was sent on a loan to HC Sierre of the Swiss League but only appeared in one game, scoring one goal, before being called up by Geneva. He finished the season with 8 points (2 goals) over 44 regular season games.

Lausanne HC

2020-21
On August 23, 2020, Maillard was traded, along with Floran Douay, to Lausanne HC in exchange for Tyler Moy. He made his debut with Lausanne on October 1, 2020 in a 5-2 home win against the SCL Tigers. On December 1, 2020, Maillard tore his ACL during the Swiss Cup 1/4 finals in his first game against his former team, Genève-Servette HC.  The injury forced Maillard to sit out the remainder of the season. He concluded his first season in Lausanne with 2 assists in 12 games.

2021-22
Maillard returned to game action with Lausanne on September 10, 2021, in a 3-2 loss to EHC Biel to kick off the season. Maillard was loaned to HC Sierre of the SL during the 2022 Winter Olympics break.

2022-23
Maillard began the 2022-23 season on loan with EHC Biel. On October 6, 2022, Maillard was suspended for three games and fined CHF 3,300 for abusing an official in a game on September 30, 2022 against the SC Rapperswil-Jona Lakers.

International play
Maillard was named to Switzerland's under-20 team for the 2018 IIHF World Junior Championships in Buffalo, New York. He played 5 games with the team, putting up 4 assists.

Maillard made his debut with Switzerland men's national team at the 2019 Deutschland Cup.

References

External links

1998 births
Living people
HC Ajoie players
EHC Biel players
Genève-Servette HC players
Lausanne HC players
HC Sierre players
Swiss ice hockey centres
Sportspeople from Lausanne